Zygodontomys brunneus, also known as the brown zygodont, brown cane mouse, or Colombian cane mouse, is a rodent species in the genus Zygodontomys of tribe Oryzomyini. It is found only in Colombia.

References

Literature cited
Duff, A. and Lawson, A. 2004. Mammals of the World: A checklist. Yale University Press, 312 pp. 
Musser, G.G. and Carleton, M.D. 2005. Superfamily Muroidea. Pp. 894–1531 in Wilson, D.E. and Reeder, D.M. (eds.). Mammal Species of the World: a taxonomic and geographic reference. 3rd ed. Baltimore: The Johns Hopkins University Press, 2 vols., 2142 pp. 

Zygodontomys
Endemic fauna of Colombia
Mammals of Colombia
Mammals described in 1898
Taxa named by Oldfield Thomas
Taxonomy articles created by Polbot
Rodents of South America